Fernando Gaviria Rendón (born 19 August 1994) is a Colombian professional road and track racing cyclist, who currently rides for UCI WorldTeam . He is well known as a sprinter. Riding for the Colombian national cycling team, Gaviria came to international attention at the 2015 Tour de San Luis, where he beat former world champion Mark Cavendish in two sprint finishes. His first major Grand Tour wins came at the 2017 Giro d'Italia.  He is the brother of track cyclist Juliana Gaviria. His nickname is "Quetzal splendente", from the brightful and colourful South American bird Quetzal. Its colours recall his world championship titles, his Colombia and "la maglia Ciclamino" won at Giro d'Italia.

Career

Early career

Before his road career, Gaviria won the omnium and madison events at the 2012 UCI Juniors Track World Championships. In 2014, he won the under-23 Pan-American road race. He also competed in the 2014 Tour de l'Avenir. Although he did not win a stage, he won the bunch sprint behind the breakaway on the first stage and ended the race second in the points competition. Later that year he won the omnium in the London round of the 2014–15 UCI Track Cycling World Cup.

Gaviria's first major road cycling winning streak started in January 2015 at the Tour de San Luis, one of the major early-season cycling races. He won a surprise victory in the first stage of the race, opening his sprint early and beating 2011 world champion Mark Cavendish of the  team into second place. Cavendish said after the race that he had not heard of Gaviria before the race. Gaviria then won the third stage of the race, again beating Cavendish into second place. Cavendish won the final stage of the event, with Gaviria finishing a close second.

Following these high-profile victories, there were reports that several UCI World Tour teams were seeking to sign Gaviria, including , though he committed his 2015 season to riding with the Colombian national team. Later reports suggested that his most likely 2016 team was Cavendish's own  team. Following Gaviria's success at the Tour de San Luis, Lefevere called this a "mistake". In February 2015, Lefevere announced that Gaviria would be undergoing tests with  after the UCI Track Cycling World Championships, a further move towards a contract for 2016. Lefevere also said that such a contract would not prevent Gaviria competing in the 2016 Summer Olympics. Gaviria's plans to ride in the 2016 Olympic Games were affirmed by Lefevere; he also suggested that Gaviria might ride as a stagiaire for the team during 2015.

In February 2015, Gaviria competed for Colombia in the track World Championships in the omnium competition. Although he won none of the six events, he was consistent throughout. In the concluding points race, he was able to gain an early lap on the field, giving him a large advantage; he was then able to mark his closest rival, Elia Viviani, and secured a comfortable overall victory to win the rainbow jersey.

Etixx–Quick-Step (2015–2018)
He finished in eighth position, the highest-placed  rider. His next race for the team was in the Czech Cycling Tour, where  won the first stage, a team time trial. The following day Gaviria won his first individual stage victory for the team, winning a reduced bunch sprint. After this race, it was the Tour of Britain, where Gaviria managed to take one stage win ahead of several world class sprinters including André Greipel and Elia Viviani.

2016 began almost as strongly as the previous season. He crashed out later in the race preventing another victory. In February he won a stage and the points classification at the new race Tour La Provence. In early March he became the first rider to win two gold medals in the Omnium at the Track Cycling World Championships by defending his title from the previous year. He won stage 3 of Tirreno–Adriatico, his first victory at World Tour level.

In 2017, he was named in the start list for the Giro d'Italia and won Stage 3 from Tortolì to Cagliari in a sprint finish, taking the lead in the general classification in the process.  He achieved further success by winning Stages 5, 12 and 13 in bunch sprints, making him the first Colombian to win four stages in a single Giro d'Italia. In July 2018, he was named in the start list for the Tour de France. Gaviria won stage 1 of the Tour de France, starting Day 2 in the Yellow Jersey. Gaviria and other major sprinters such as André Greipel and Dylan Groenewegen were unable to finish stage 11 which was the third major hilly alps stage within the time limit and were eliminated. Gaviria suffered a broken collarbone at the Tour of Turkey and was forced to abandon, ending his 2018 campaign.

UAE Team Emirates (2019–2022)
Shortly after his injury at the Tour of Turkey, it was announced that Gaviria was joining the  team on a three-year contract from the 2019 season. In August 2019, he was named in the startlist for the Vuelta a España.

Movistar Team (2023–)
For the 2023 season, Gaviria joined  on a one-year contract.

Major results

Track

2012
 UCI World Junior Championships
1st  Omnium
1st  Madison (with Jordan Parra)
2013
 Pan American Championships
1st  Omnium
2nd  Team pursuit
 Bolivarian Games
1st  Omnium
1st  Madison (with Juan Arango)
 2nd Omnium, National Championships
2014
 1st  Omnium, Central American and Caribbean Games
 1st  Omnium, South American Games
 1st Omnium, UCI World Cup, London
2015
 Pan American Games
1st  Omnium
1st  Team pursuit
 1st  Omnium, UCI World Championships
2016
 1st  Omnium, UCI World Championships
2019
 Torneo Internacional de Pista de Cali
1st Madison (with Juan Arango)
2nd Omnium

Road

2012
 1st  Time trial, National Junior Championships
2013
 1st  Road race, Bolivarian Games
2014
 1st  Road race, Pan American Under-23 Championships
 Central American and Caribbean Games
2nd  Time trial
4th Road race
2015
 Tour de San Luis
1st Stages 1 & 3
 Czech Cycling Tour
1st Stages 1 (TTT) & 2
 1st Stage 4 Tour of Britain
 Pan American Games
8th Time trial
9th Road race
 8th RideLondon–Surrey Classic
2016
 1st Paris–Tours
 1st Grand Prix Impanis-Van Petegem
 Tour La Provence
1st  Points classification
1st Stage 3
 Tour de Pologne
1st Stages 2 & 4
 Tour de San Luis
1st Stages 1 (TTT) & 2
 1st Stage 3 Tirreno–Adriatico
 2nd Gran Piemonte
 2nd Kampioenschap van Vlaanderen
 6th Gent–Wevelgem
 7th Halle–Ingooigem
 10th Dwars door Vlaanderen
2017
 1st  Kampioenschap van Vlaanderen
 Giro d'Italia
1st  Points classification
1st Stages 3, 5, 12 & 13
Held  &  after Stage 3
 Tour of Guangxi
1st  Points classification
1st Stages 1, 2, 3 & 6
 Vuelta a San Juan
1st Stages 1 & 4
 1st Stage 6 Tirreno–Adriatico
 1st Stage 1 Volta ao Algarve
 1st Stage 4 Tour of Britain
 4th Primus Classic
 5th Milan–San Remo
 8th Road race, UCI World Championships
 9th Gent–Wevelgem
2018
 Tour de France
1st Stages 1 & 4
Held  &  after Stage 1
Held  after Stages 1–2
 Tour of California
1st  Points classification
1st Stages 1, 5 & 7
 Colombia Oro y Paz
1st  Points classification
1st Stages 1, 2 & 3
 1st Stage 1 Vuelta a San Juan
2019
 Giro d'Italia
1st Stage 3
Held  after Stage 3
 Tour of Guangxi
1st Stages 1 & 5
 Vuelta a San Juan
1st Stages 1 & 4
 1st Stage 2 UAE Tour
 2nd Three Days of Bruges–De Panne
 4th Münsterland Giro
2020
 1st Giro della Toscana
 Vuelta a San Juan
1st Stages 2, 4 & 7
 1st Stage 2 Vuelta a Burgos
 1st Stage 2 Tour du Limousin
 7th Milano–Torino
2021
 1st Stage 3 Tour de Pologne
 3rd Grand Prix de Fourmies
 10th Brussels Cycling Classic
2022
 Tour of Oman
1st  Points classification
1st Stages 1 & 6
 2nd Eschborn–Frankfurt
2023
 1st Stage 4 Vuelta a San Juan
 2nd Milano–Torino
 7th Clásica de Almería

Grand Tour general classification results timeline

Classic results timeline

References

External links

1994 births
Living people
Colombian male cyclists
Colombian track cyclists
Cyclists at the 2015 Pan American Games
Olympic cyclists of Colombia
Cyclists at the 2016 Summer Olympics
Pan American Games medalists in cycling
Pan American Games gold medalists for Colombia
Colombian Giro d'Italia stage winners
Colombian Tour de France stage winners
South American Games gold medalists for Colombia
South American Games medalists in cycling
Competitors at the 2014 South American Games
Medalists at the 2015 Pan American Games
Sportspeople from Antioquia Department
20th-century Colombian people
21st-century Colombian people
Competitors at the 2014 Central American and Caribbean Games